The Metaline Falls–Nelway Border Crossing connects the town of Metaline Falls, Washington with Nelway and Nelson, British Columbia at the Canada–US border. Access is via Washington State Route 31 on the American side and British Columbia Highway 6 on the Canadian side. 

The popular belief is that Nelway is a contraction of "Nelson and Spokane highway," but could be for Nelson and Fort Sheppard Railway, which passed in the vicinity. Canada has had a customs office in the Nelson area since 1900, but this particular crossing did not exist until the Pend Oreille Highway was completed in 1921. The highway on the BC side officially opened in 1923, but the name Nelway did not appear until 1926.

The BC part of the highway was subject to criticism for decades because the road was narrow, winding and rough, making travel slow and difficult. To handle increasing traffic, sections were progressively realigned and paved from 1948, and throughout the following decade.

The US still occupies the original permanent border station at this crossing, built in the mid-1930s; it was recorded on the U.S. National Register of Historic Places in 1997. Canada replaced its depression-era border station in 1951, then replaced it again in 2000. Today the crossing is often used by tourists exploring the International Selkirk Loop.

See also
 List of Canada–United States border crossings

References

Canada–United States border crossings
Government buildings on the National Register of Historic Places in Washington (state)
National Register of Historic Places in Pend Oreille County, Washington
1921 establishments in Washington (state)
1921 establishments in British Columbia